Mahesh Bhupathi and Todd Woodbridge were the defending champions, but did not participate this year.

Fabrice Santoro and Nenad Zimonjić won the title, defeating František Čermák and Leoš Friedl 6–1, 6–4 in the final.

Seeds

Draw

Draw

References
Draw

2006 ATP Tour
Men's Doubles